Alexo is a ghost town in Alberta, Canada. The Town of Alexo has recently been transformed into a summer camp by YouthHQ which operates out of Red Deer, Alberta. Shunda Creek and the North Saskatchewan River run to the south of it.

History
Access to the Alexo area was poor prior to 1913 when the Brazeau Branch rail line (part of the Canadian Northern Railway which later became part of the Canadian National Railway) to the coal mine at Nordegg was opened. This created access to coal markets, and other mining ventures soon started near the tracks. The mine at Alexo, which was named after the Alexo Coal Company, was one of them, as were the mines at Saunders Creek and Harlech.

The Alexo mine began operation in 1920, and by 1948 annual production was about 33,000 tonnes. The payroll included about 70 people, of whom 30 were miners. There was a hotel, a cookhouse, a bunkhouse, a store, and 30 cottages.

The coal in the Alexo area is part of the early Paleocene Coalspur Formation and is of high-volatile "C" bituminous rank. The mine worked a single seam that was consistently about 5 feet (1.5m) thick, with a shallow dip to the northeast. Mining was done by underground room and pillar methods. The average heat content of the Alexo product was 11,633 British Thermal Units per pound.

The Alexo mine closed in 1955 due to declining markets for steam coal as the railroads replaced steam locomotives with diesel, and the town was dismantled. Total coal production had been 764,600 tonnes.

As of 2016, most of the former Alexo townsite is leased by the Provincial government to the Youth and Volunteer Centre of Red Deer, Alberta and is home to a summer camp called Camp Alexo.

References 

Localities in Clearwater County, Alberta
Ghost towns in Alberta